Chang'e (alternatively rendered as Chang-Er or Ch‘ang-o), originally known as Heng'e, is the Chinese goddess of the Moon. She is the subject of several legends in Chinese mythology, most of which incorporate several of the following elements: Houyi the archer, a benevolent or malevolent emperor, an elixir of life, and the Moon. She was married to Houyi. In modern times, Chang'e has been the namesake of the Chinese Lunar Exploration Program.

Tales
There are many tales about Chang'e, including a well-known story about her that is given as the origin of the Mid-Autumn Festival. In one version, in a very distant past, Chang'e was a beautiful woman. Ten suns had risen together into the skies and scorched the Earth, thus causing hardship for the people. Houyi the archer shot down nine of them, leaving just one Sun, and was given either two or one with enough for two elixirs of immortality as a reward. He did not consume it straight away, but let Chang'e keep it with her, as he did not want to gain immortality without his beloved wife. However, while Houyi went out hunting, his apprentice Fengmeng broke into his house and tried to force Chang'e to give the elixir to him. She took them instead of giving them to Fengmeng. Then, Chang'e flew upward past the heavens, choosing the Moon as a residence, as she loved her husband and hoped to live nearby him. Houyi discovered what had transpired and felt guilty, so he displayed the fruits and cakes that Chang'e had enjoyed, and killed himself. In older versions of the story, Chang'e stole the elixir from Houyi, drank it, and flew to the Moon so that her husband could not go after her. Chang'e appears in Wu Cheng'en's late 16th-century novel Journey to the West.

Worship
The recently rediscovered divination text Guicang contains the story of Chang'e as a story providing the meaning to Hexagram 54 of the I Ching, "Returning Maiden". 

During the Mid-Autumn Festival, when the full Moon appears on the night of the eighth lunar month, an open-air altar is set up facing the Moon for the worship of Chang'e. New pastries are put on the altar for her to bless, and she is said to endow her worshippers with beauty. Her story is commonly used as a cautionary tale from older generations to warn young girls about the dangers of following selfish desires.

Space travel
 Chang'e was mentioned in a conversation between Houston CAPCOM and the Apollo 11 crew just before the first Moon landing in 1969:  The International Astronomical Union has assigned the name Chang-Ngo to a small impact crater on the Moon. In 2007, China launched its first lunar probe, a robotic spacecraft named Chang'e 1 in the Goddess' honor. A second robotic probe, named Chang'e 2, was launched in 2010. A third Chang'e spacecraft, called Chang'e 3, landed on the Moon on December 14, 2013, making China the third country in the world to achieve such a feat after the former Soviet Union and the United States. The lander also delivered the robotic rover Yutu ("Jade Rabbit") to the lunar surface. On January 3, 2019, Chang'e 4 touched down on the far side of the Moon and deployed the Yutu-2 rover.

In popular culture
The original plotline and inspiration of Naoko Takeuchi's Sailor Moon is inspired by the legend of Chang'e. The titular character is a princess of the Moon while her love interest is from Earth. 

In 2013, Chang'e was released as a playable character in the MOBA Smite.

In 2018, Chang'e was also released as a playable character in Mobile Legends: Bang Bang.

In the video game series Touhou Project, Chang'e is the mysterious sworn enemy of Junko, the final boss of the 15th game Legacy of Lunatic Kingdom.

Chang'e and her story is the main theme of the 2020 American-Chinese animated feature film Over the Moon produced by Netflix. The goddess is voiced by Phillipa Soo.

Chang'e and Houyi's story is retold in Emily R. X. Pan's 2020 novel An Arrow to the Moon.

Chang'e and her story was reimagined in the 2022 fantasy novel The Daughter of the Moon Goddess by Sue Lynn Tan.

In the 2022 game Dislyte, The character Heng Yue is imbued with Chang'e's powers.

Notes

References

Bibliography

Further reading
 Allan, Tony, Charles Phillips, and John Chinnery, Land of the Dragon: Chinese Myth, Duncan Baird Publishers, London, 2005 (through Barnes & Noble Books), 
 Laing, Ellen Johnston, "From Thief to Deity: The Pictorial Record of the Chinese Moon Goddess, Chang E" in Kuhn, Dieter & Stahl, Helga, The Presence of Antiquity: Form and Function of References to Antiquity in the Cultural Centers of Europe and East Asia. Wuerzburg, 2001, pp. 437–54.

External links

Chinese goddesses
Lunar goddesses
Deities in Taoism